On September 30, 2022, a suicide bomber blew himself up at the Kaaj education center in Dashte Barchi, a Hazara neighborhood in Kabul, Afghanistan, killing at least 52 people according to the Associated Press. The majority of the victims were young female students.

Background
After the fall of Kabul ended the War in Afghanistan in 2021, the ruling Taliban vowed to protect citizens, including minorities. However, the country has once again witnessed occasional terrorist attacks, especially against minorities.

Bombing
The explosion occurred on September 30, 2022, at around 7:30 am UTC+04:30 at the Kaaj education center, located in a predominantly Hazara neighborhood. Approximately 300 recent high school graduates arrived at the education center one hour before the attack took place. Many of the victims included high school graduates who were taking a practice university exam at the time of the explosion. According to a witness interviewed by the Associated Press, there were gunshots heard outside the building prior to the detonation.

No one has claimed responsibility for the attack, but Financial Times author Benjamin Parkin speculated that it could be ISIS-K, the local affiliate of the Islamic State, due to their history of targeting Hazara people.

Reactions 
UNICEF has stated that it was "appalled by the horrific attack", while United States charge d'affaires at the embassy in Afghanistan, Karen Decker, called the attacks "shameful".

The Taliban spokesman Zabiullah Mujahid condemned the attack on Twitter, claiming the attack was a big crime that was strongly condemned and expressed his sympathy to the families of the victims.

Abdul Rahman Nafiz, the local police chief in the region reportedly criticized the Kaaj education centre for not informing the police of the practice exam that was taking place.

The Interior Ministry spokesman, Abdul Nafi Takor, told the press that police have reportedly arrested a suspect potentially linked to this attack.

Muhammad Mohaqiq, the chairman of People's Islamic Unity Party of Afghanistan, has warned the resistance by Hazaras will start and allowed anyone who want join resistance.

The Guardian reported that women protesting the attack were being beaten by the Taliban.

A Twitter campaign with the hashtag #StopHazaraGenocide was started on October 2, 2022. The hashtag has been tweeted over 3 million times and was supported by celebrities from Afghanistan and rest of the world.

See also
 List of terrorist attacks in Kabul

References

September school bombing
2022 murders in Afghanistan
2020s building bombings
September 2022 school bombing
21st-century mass murder in Afghanistan
Attacks on buildings and structures in 2022
September 2022 school
Mass murder in 2022
September 2022 school bombing
Persecution of Hazaras
School bombings in Asia
September 2022 crimes in Asia
September 2022 events in Afghanistan
September 2022 school
Suicide bombings in the 2020s
Terrorist incidents in Afghanistan in 2022